Remo Mally (born 24 March 1991) is an Austrian footballer who plays as a defender for USV Mettersdorf.

External links

 

Austrian footballers
Austrian Football Bundesliga players
FK Austria Wien players
1991 births
Living people
SC Wiener Neustadt players
Association football defenders